A list of films produced in Russia in 2003 (see 2003 in film).

2003

See also
 2003 in Russia

External links
 Russian films of 2003 at the Internet Movie Database

2003
Films
Russia